Ultra.2010 is a dance compilation album from Ultra Records, compiling original and remixed tracks from the label. It was released on November 3, 2009.

Track listing 
Disc One:
"When Love Takes Over" – David Guetta ft. Kelly Rowland
"I Know You Want Me (Calle Ocho) (Alex Gaudino and Jason Rooney Remix)" – Pitbull
"When I Grow Up (Dave Audé Audacious Club)" – The Pussycat Dolls
"Poker Face (Dave Audé Remix)" – Lady Gaga
"Infinity (Klaas Vocal Mix)" – Guru Josh Project
"If U Seek Amy (Radio Edit)" – Britney Spears
"Leave the World Behind" – Axwell, Ingrosso, Angello, Laidback Luke ft. Deborah Cox
"Let Me Be Real (Radio Edit)" – Fedde le Grand ft. Mitch Crown
"Ghosts ‘n’ Stuff" – deadmau5 ft. Rob Swire
"No Superstar (Full Vocal Mix)" – Remady
"Feel It In My Bones" – Tiësto ft. Tegan and Sara
"Ready for the Weekend" – Calvin Harris

Disc Two:
"Girl I’m Trying (Weekend Radio Edit)" – J Brazil
"Now You See It (Club Mix)" – Honorebel ft. Pitbull & Jump Smokers
"Gifted (Treasure Fingers Remix)" – N.A.S.A. ft. Kanye West, Santogold & Lykke Li
"Took the Night (Luxury Goods Mix)" – Chelley
"Hot (Play and Win Radio Edit)" – Inna
"This Is How It Goes (Kaskade’s Grand Club Edit)" – Haley
"Feel It 2009 (Pop Trumpet Club Mix)" – The Tamperer ft. Maya
"76, Ocean Drive (Apache Vocal Mix)" – Nicola Fasano vs Pat-Rich
"Feelings Gone" – Basement Jaxx ft. Sam Sparro
"Cry Tonight (Kiss Me Back) (Extended Mix)" – Kim Sozzi
"Take Me Away (Into The Night) (Dave Darell Remix)" – 4 Strings
"Every Morning" – Basshunter

References

External links
Album Site at Ultra Records

2009 compilation albums
Dance music compilation albums
Ultra Records albums